The Magician of Lublin is a 1979 drama film co-written and directed by Menahem Golan based on The Magician of Lublin by Isaac Bashevis Singer. The film's title song was performed by Kate Bush.

Plot

Yasha Mazur (Alan Arkin) is a turn-of-the-20th-century Jewish stage magician, womaniser, con man, and mystic. His great ambition is to figure out how to fly – an ambition he eventually achieves but not as a magic trick.  He tours the western reaches of the old Russian Empire.

Yasha is married to Esther (Linda Bernstein), but he is rarely home in Lublin to see her and they have not been able to have any children.  On the road, however, he has plenty of women as company.  Among many others are the zaftig Zeftel (Valerie Perrine) and Yasha's Polish Catholic assistant, Magda (Maia Danziger), who tours and performs with him.  Magda's brother Bolek (Zachi Noy) is an incompetent, and their mother Elzbieta (Shelley Winters) is desperate. Magda herself is mentally unstable.

The great loves of Yasha's life, and the great ambition of his love, are the aristocratic but poor widow Emilia (Louise Fletcher), whom he would marry; and her daughter Halina (Lisa Whelchel), whom he adores as if she were his own. Halina is ill and needs medical care, and Emilia knows Yasha will never be able to provide; so she must keep herself free to marry someone who can pay for the medical treatment her daughter needs.

Yasha's big break looms.  In addition to demonstrating a Houdini-style escape from a tank of water while shackled, Yasha convinces his manager/impresario Wolsky (Lou Jacobi) that he can fly. Wolsky arranges for a booking at the prestigious Alhambra theatre in Warsaw. Yasha anticipates success, but Zeftel arrives unexpectedly and innocently announces she is emigrating to America – to "Buenos Aires" – where a man has promised her work. Yasha knows that Buenos Aires is in Argentina, not America. He also knows that the man who is going to take her there is a pimp, who is selling her into sexual slavery.  To save Zeftel, Yasha performs a special show of magic and card tricks for the pimp and gives him money.

Thus he misses his big break – and discovers the next morning that Zeftel had lied to him, after he attempts to burglarise the home of Count Zaruski to steal the money Emilia needs to take Halina to Italy for her cure, and so that Emilia will marry him instead of the Count.  His attempt at burglary fails because he has a vision of blood and death that distracts him. He manages to escape, using his cape as wings to glide him safely to the ground.  But he is emotionally fragile, knowing that he has lost Emila and Halina, as well as his career. Real horror awaits. He returns to his rooms and discovers that Magda killed herself.

Fully broken, Yasha returns home to Esther.  His mystic vision of death having come true, he encloses himself in a brick hut with only a window, through which to receive food and communicate with people as a holy man, dispensing wisdom and blessings.  Wolsky arrives, having read in the Warsaw papers about the holy man of Lublin who lives in a grave.  He has brought Emilia with him, who asks Yasha's forgiveness and asks him to pray for her.  She is now the Countess Zaruski, and Halina is at least in a sanitorium in Italy receiving treatment.

Another visitor from away has also come.  She is a widow, heavily veiled in black mourning, who has also heard of the holy man in the brick hut who spends his days in prayer and study of the Torah. She has come to seek his advice what to do: mourning the loss of her daughter who killed herself for love of a man, she cannot forgive the man. Suddenly she pulls back her veil and reveals that she is Elzbieta, come with Bolek and some friends to avenge Magda's death by killing Yasha.  A battering ram is brought and attacks the brick hut, again and again, until its walls collapse and the hut is opened.  Elzbieta and Bolek are ready to kill the man they blame for Magda's suicide.

However, Yasha is not inside the brick hut when it is open.  He is nowhere to be seen but neither could he possibly have escaped.  All fall back dumbfounded by an apparent miracle, and then they see a skein of geese in the sky – and one goose in particular, chasing after it. Yasha truly had learned to fly.

Cast

Reception
The film was a box office and critical failure.  As an example, Time Out London wrote, "...Golan overdramatises, tips into hysteria, and substitutes a specious mysticism that is sadly literal."

References

External links 
 
 
 

1979 films
1979 drama films
Israeli drama films
German drama films
West German films
English-language German films
English-language Israeli films
1970s German-language films
Films directed by Menahem Golan
Films based on works by Isaac Bashevis Singer
Films based on American novels
Films set in the 1900s
Films set in Poland
Films set in the Russian Empire
Films shot in Germany
Golan-Globus films
Films about Jews and Judaism
Films about magic and magicians
Films scored by Maurice Jarre
Films produced by Menahem Golan
Films with screenplays by Menahem Golan
Films produced by Yoram Globus
1970s German films